Acetivibrio  straminisolvens is a moderately thermophilic, aerotolerant and cellulolytic bacterium. It is non-motile, spore-forming, straight or slightly curved rod, with type strain CSK1T (=DSM 16021T =IAM 15070T). Its genome has been sequenced.

References

Further reading

External links
 
 LPSN
 Type strain of Clostridium straminisolvens at BacDive -  the Bacterial Diversity Metadatabase
 lpsn.dsmz.de, list of prokaryotic names with standing nomenclature, Clostridium straminisolvens etymology

Gram-positive bacteria
Bacteria described in 2004
Oscillospiraceae